The Gelre Armorial is a medieval armorial.

History
The armorial was compiled before 1396 by one Claes Heinenzoon (or Heynen, fl. 1345−1414) who was a  herald in the service of the Duke of Guelders and also the creator of the Beyeren Armorial. The book displays some 1,800 coats-of-arms from all over Europe, in color, and is one of the most important sources for medieval heraldry.

The Gelre Armorial manuscript is nowadays preserved in the Royal Library of Belgium (signature code ms. 15652-5). This version, however, only contains 1400 arms. From 1880 to 1905, Victor Bouton produced 60 copies with hand-coloured arms.

Earliest known colour depiction of the Danish Flag

The book also contains the oldest known depiction linking the Danish king to the red flag with white cross. On folio page 55v of the armorial, behind the sinister horn is a lance tip with a banner, displaying a white cross on red. The text left of the coat of arms says die coninc van denmarke ("the king of Denmark"). This is the earliest known coloured image of the Dannebrog (Danish flag).

Bibliography
 Victor Bouton: Wapenboeck, ou Armorial de 1334 à 1372 : contenant les noms et armes des princes chrétiens ecclésiastiques et séculiers, suivis de leurs feudataires selon la constitution de l'Europe et particulièrement de l'empire d'Allemagne… / par Gelre, héraut d'armes, Paris 1897. (Digitalisat 1)(Digitalisat 2)

Gallery

External links

Gelre Armorial digital viewer on KBR site
Gelre Armorial in Gallica
Facebook Page on the Gelre Armorial
Text version of the Gelre Armorial

References

Dutch coats of arms
Illuminated heraldic manuscripts
Rolls of arms
14th-century manuscripts